Poeciloderas is a genus of horse flies in the family Tabanidae.

Species
Poeciloderas allusiosis Wilkerson, 1979
Poeciloderas caesiomaculatus (Kröber, 1931)
Poeciloderas histrio (Wiedemann, 1830)
Poeciloderas lindneri (Kröber, 1929)
Poeciloderas lucipennis Kröber, 1934
Poeciloderas ornatipennis (Kröber, 1934)
Poeciloderas pampeanus Coscarón & Fairchild, 1976
Poeciloderas quadripunctatus (Fabricius, 1805)
Poeciloderas seclusus (Brèthes, 1910)

References

Tabanidae
Diptera of North America
Diptera of South America
Taxa named by Adolfo Lutz
Brachycera genera